Oasis is an album by organist Shirley Scott recorded in 1989 and released on the Muse label.

Reception
The Allmusic site awarded the album 4 stars stating "Scott is in fine form throughout the album, playing with plenty of warmth and feeling on original material as well as soulful interpretations".

Track listing 
All compositions by Shirley Scott except as indicated
 "Oasis" - 6:53  
 "Lament" (J. J. Johnson) - 7:19  
 "Blues Everywhere" - 8:48 Bonus track on CD 
 "Alone Together" (Howard Dietz, Arthur Schwartz) - 7:08  
 "Basie in Mind" - 7:11  
 "Do You Know a Good Thing When You See One?" - 6:54  
 "Nature Boy" (eden ahbez) - 8:45

Personnel 
 Shirley Scott - organ
 Virgil Jones - trumpet (tracks 1-3 & 5-7)
 Charles Davis - tenor saxophone (tracks 1-3 & 5-7)
 Houston Person - tenor saxophone (track 3)
 Arthur Harper - bass 
 Mickey Roker - drums

References 

1989 albums
Muse Records albums
Shirley Scott albums